Ian Culbard, professionally known as I. N. J. Culbard, is a British comic artist, writer and animator.

Biography 
Culbard was born in Greenwich, London. He began his career as an animator but is best known for his work in comics and has gained a reputation in particular for his adaptations of classics by H.P. Lovecraft, Robert W. Chambers and Arthur Conan Doyle. 
 
His earliest comics work was a contribution to an anthology of competition entries by undiscovered newcomers published as Dark Horse Comics’ New Recruits, followed by some work in the Judge Dredd Megazine and the first of his classics adaptations for SelfMadeHero: The Picture of Dorian Gray in collaboration with Ian Edginton.

Culbard’s first original graphic novel was Celeste, a science fiction story published in 2014 by SelfMadeHero. Other notable original series include those published in 2000 AD: Brass Sun, a steampunk adventure story created in collaboration with Ian Edginton and the science fiction police drama Brink in collaboration with Dan Abnett. Culbard and Abnett have also worked together for Boom! Studios on Wild’s End and for Vertigo on The New Deadwardians.

He won a British Fantasy Award in 2011 for his adaptation of At the Mountains of Madness.

Influences 
Culbard has credited French comics creator Jean-Claude Mézières’ science fiction series Valerian and Laureline as well as Katsuhiro Otomo’s manga Domu as influences on his style. He attributes much of his pace and visual economy to the influence of manga.

Selected bibliography
 Wild's End: The Enemy Within (written by Dan Abnett, BOOM! Studios, 2016) 
 The King in Yellow (written by Robert W. Chambers, SelfMadeHero, 2015)
 Celeste (SelfMadeHero, 2014)
 Brass Sun: The Wheel of Worlds (written by Ian Edginton, Rebellion Developments, 2014)
 The Dream-Quest of Unknown Kadath (written by H.P. Lovecraft, SelfMadeHero, 2014)
 The New Deadwardians (written by Dan Abnett, DC Comics, 2013)
 The Shadow Out of Time (written by H.P. Lovecraft, SelfMadeHero, 2013)
 Deadbeats (written by Chris Lackey & Chad Fifer, SelfMadeHero, 2012)
 The Case of Charles Dexter Ward: A Graphic Novel (written by H.P. Lovecraft, SelfMadeHero, 2012)
 The Valley of Fear (written by Arthur Conan Doyle, text adapted by Ian Edginton, SelfMadeHero, 2011)

References 

Living people
British comics artists
British comics writers
Year of birth missing (living people)